Colorado Serenade (also known as Gentlemen with Guns) is a 1946 American Western film directed by Robert Emmett Tansey and written by Frances Kavanaugh. The film stars Eddie Dean, Roscoe Ates, David Sharpe, Mary Kenyon, Forrest Taylor, Dennis Moore and Abigail Adams. The film was released on June 30, 1946, by Producers Releasing Corporation.

Plot

Cast          
Eddie Dean as Eddie Dean
Roscoe Ates as Soapy
David Sharpe as Nevada
Mary Kenyon as Sherry Lynn
Forrest Taylor as Judge Roy Hilton
Dennis Moore as Duke Dillon
Abigail Adams as Lola
Warner Richmond as Dad Dillon
Lee Bennett as Parson Trimble
Robert McKenzie as Col. Blake
Bob Duncan as Ringo

References

External links
 

1946 films
1940s English-language films
American Western (genre) films
1946 Western (genre) films
Producers Releasing Corporation films
Films directed by Robert Emmett Tansey
1940s American films